Mechanicsville is the name of several localities in North America.

Canada
Mechanicsville (Ottawa), a neighborhood in Ottawa, Ontario

United States
Mechanicsville, Connecticut, census-designated place in Windham County
Mechanicsville, Delaware 
Mechanicsville (Atlanta), Georgia, a neighborhood
Mechanicsville (Gwinnett County, Georgia), an unincorporated community
Mechanicsville, Indiana
Mechanicsville, Iowa
Mechanicsville, Maryland
Mechanicsville, Missouri
Mechanicsville, Hunterdon County, New Jersey
Mechanicsville, Middlesex County, New Jersey
Mechanicsville, Monmouth County, New Jersey
Mechanicville, New York 
Mechanicsville, Pennsylvania (disambiguation) (multiple)
Mechanicsville, South Carolina
Mechanicsville, Knoxville, Tennessee, a neighborhood
Mechanicsville, Virginia (multiple)

See also
Mechanicsburg (disambiguation)